Ory or ORY may refer to:

People
 Ory (surname)
 Ory Dessau, 21st century Israeli art curator and critic
 Ory Okolloh, 21st century Kenyan activist, lawyer and blogger
 Ory Shihor (born 1967), Israeli pianist

Other uses
 the title character of Le comte Ory, an 1828 opera written by Gioachino Rossini
 ORY, IATA airport code for Orly Airport, south of Paris, France
 ory, ISO 639-3 code for the Oriya language

See also
 Ori (disambiguation)
 Orry (disambiguation)